Guangzhou TV Tower is a  lattice telecommunication tower in the southern Chinese city of Guangzhou with an observation deck, erected in 1991.

A newer  tower was completed in Guangzhou in October 2010, named Canton Tower that initially bore the name Guangzhou TV and Sightseeing Tower. It features observation decks on floors 107 and 108.

References

External links

Towers completed in 1991
Buildings and structures in Guangzhou
Towers in China
Yuexiu District
1991 establishments in China